State Route 242 (SR 242) is a three-mile (5 km) state highway in the U.S. state of California that links Interstate 680 north of Pleasant Hill to State Route 4 in Concord in Contra Costa County. Along with Interstate 580, State Route 24, Interstate 680 and State Route 4, it serves as the most direct route between the San Francisco Bay Area and the Sacramento–San Joaquin River Delta region.

In 2000, State Route 242 was widened to six through-traffic lanes for the entire route.  Ramp metering is present at all onramps, and is used southbound in the morning and northbound in the evening.  It was signed as part of State Route 24 until ca. 1987.

Route description
The route begins as a freeway at Interstate 680 in Concord. It then heads north, meeting Clayton Road, Concord Avenue, Grant Street, and Olivera Road before meeting its north end at State Route 4 just west of the former Concord Naval Weapons Station.

SR 242 is part of the California Freeway and Expressway System, and is part of the National Highway System, a network of highways that are considered essential to the country's economy, defense, and mobility by the Federal Highway Administration.

Exit list

See also

References

External links

Caltrans: Route 242 highway conditions
California Highways: Route 242
California @ AARoads.com - State Route 242

242
242
State Route 242
Concord, California